Aref Khosravinia is an Iranian Paralympic athlete. He represented Iran at the 2000 Summer Paralympics in Sydney, Australia and he won the gold medal in the men's discus throw F57 event.

References

External links 
 

Living people
Year of birth missing (living people)
Place of birth missing (living people)
Paralympic athletes of Iran
Athletes (track and field) at the 2000 Summer Paralympics
Medalists at the 2000 Summer Paralympics
Paralympic gold medalists for Iran
Paralympic medalists in athletics (track and field)
Iranian male discus throwers
Wheelchair discus throwers
Paralympic discus throwers
20th-century Iranian people
21st-century Iranian people